The Hunan softshell turtle (Pelodiscus axenaria) is a species of turtle in the family Trionychidae, the softshells. It is endemic to China, where it occurs in Hunan, Guangdong, Guangxi, and Jiangxi provinces. It is found in Taoyuan, Pingjiang, Rucheng, Lingling, and Shaoyang counties of Hunan province (Zhou, Zhang & Fang, 1991).

References

Bibliography
 

Pelodiscus
Endemic fauna of China
Reptiles described in 1991